Kirk Lake is a controlled lake in the hamlet of Mahopac in the town of Carmel in Putnam County, New York.  It lies due west and sharply below considerably larger Lake Mahopac.  It is one of three controlled lakes in the New York City water supply system's Croton Watershed.

The outfall of Kirk Lake forms the northernmost headwaters of the Muscoot River, a tributary of the Croton River in the Croton River watershed. Approximately one-half mile south of its dam its waters are joined by a small flow from Lake Mahopac, which shortly cross into Westchester County and drain into the Amawalk Reservoir in the town of Somers.

History
Kirk Lake was originally much smaller than today.  A dam was built in 1871, and substantially altered into a 220' wide, 28' high structure in 1881, dramatically enlarging its impoundment area.  It is unclear whether there would be any natural impoundment at all if it were removed.

The dam is a stone masonry-earth buttress. The top of the dam is 592.3 feet above Mean Sea Level. 
Its crest is 61 feet wide, some 28 feet above the Muscoot River. Kirk Lake is owned by the New York City Department of Environmental Protection (which absorbed the New York City Bureau of Water Supply). Its drainage area is 2.95 square miles, and maximum discharge of its spillway and 36" overflow pipe 440 cubic feet of water per second.

The normal length of Kirk Lake's pool is 0.8 miles, with a total surface area of 124 acres. Maximum pool size is 220 acres.

See also
List of rivers of New York

References

Lakes of Putnam County, New York
Tributaries of the Hudson River